General elections were held in Saint Kitts and Nevis on Friday 5 June 2020.

The ruling coalition, Team Unity consisting of PAM, CCM and PLP, won a landslide victory with nine out of the eleven directly elected deputies, and netting a combined 54.85% of the vote. However, similar to the prior elections in 2015, the individual party that won the most votes (PAM) did not win the most seats.

Electoral system
Eleven of the fifteen seats in the National Assembly are elected, with three other members appointed by the Governor-General at some point after the elections and one seat held by the Attorney-General. The eleven elected seats are elected in single-member constituencies using plurality voting.

Results

Elected MPs

References

External links
Saint Kitts and Nevis on the Political Database of the Americas
Adam Carr's Election Archive

Saint Kitts
2020 in Saint Kitts and Nevis
Elections in Saint Kitts and Nevis